Special pleading is an informal fallacy wherein one cites something as an exception to a general or universal principle, without justifying the special exception. It is the application of a double standard.

In the classic distinction among material fallacies, cognitive fallacies, and formal fallacies, special pleading most likely falls within the category of a cognitive fallacy, because it would seem to relate to "lip service", rationalization, and diversion (abandonment of discussion). Special pleading also often resembles the "appeal to" logical fallacies.

In medieval philosophy, it was not presumed that wherever a distinction is claimed, a relevant basis for the distinction should exist and be substantiated. Special pleading subverts a presumption of existential import.

Examples 
A difficult case is when a possible criticism is made relatively immune to investigation. This immunity may take the forms of:

 unexplained claims of exemption from principles commonly thought relevant to the subject matter
Example: I'm not relying on faith in small probabilities here. These are slot machines, not roulette wheels. They are different.

 creation of an ad-hoc exception to prevent the rule from backfiring against the claim:
Example: Everyone has a duty to help the police do their job, no matter who the suspect is. That is why we must support investigations into corruption in the police department. No person is above the law. Of course, if the police come knocking on my door to ask about my neighbors and the robberies in our building, I know nothing. I’m not about to rat on anybody.

 "You aren't like me, so you do not even have a right to think about or hold opinions on my plight."

Statistical
This variation occurs when the interpretation of the relevant statistic is "massaged" by looking for ways to reclassify or requantify data from one portion of results, but not applying the same scrutiny to other categories.

See also 
 Ad hoc hypothesis
 Cherry picking (fallacy)
 Courtier's reply
 Exception that proves the rule
 Hard cases make bad law
 Moving the goalposts
 No true Scotsman
 Relativist fallacy

References

External links 
 Special pleading at the Fallacy Files
 Special pleading at the Nizkor Project 

Relevance fallacies